Disney's Hide and Sneak, known in Japan as , is an action-adventure video game released in 2003 by Capcom for the Nintendo GameCube. This was the last Disney video game to feature Mickey Mouse as the lead protagonist until the 2010 video game Epic Mickey.

Plot
The story begins when a small alien named Lu-Lu was floating around in space, she gets hit by a meteor and falls to earth. Meanwhile, on earth, Mickey and Minnie Mouse were having a picnic when they discovered Lu-Lu. At first, they thought it was a mushroom, but then Minnie (if the player is playing as Mickey) or Mickey (if the player is playing as Minnie) climbs on her and started doing poses for the player character. Then, all of a sudden, Lu-Lu started floating away with the other mouse still standing on it. It was up to the player character to go after them and find them. Towards the end of the game, Mickey and Minnie finally help Lu-Lu summon a giant alien space ship. Lu-Lu floats up along the tractor beam of the ship, and Mickey and Minnie say good bye to her as she flies back home to outer space in the ship.

Reception

The game received "generally unfavorable" reviews according to the review aggregation website Metacritic. In Japan, Famitsu gave it a score of 26 out of 40.

See also
List of Disney video games
Disney's Magical Mirror Starring Mickey Mouse

References

External links
 

2003 video games
Action-adventure games
Disney games by Capcom
GameCube games
GameCube-only games
Mickey Mouse video games
Video games developed in Japan
Video games featuring female protagonists
Single-player video games